Elliott is a rural locality in the local government area of Waratah-Wynyard in the North West region of Tasmania.
The 2016 census determined a population of 352 for the state suburb of Elliott.

History
The locality name was applied to a parish by 1886, and to a post station by 1899. It was gazetted in 1966.

Geography
The Cam River forms most of the eastern boundary.

Road infrastructure
The A10 route (Murchison Highway) enters from the north and runs through to the south-west before exiting. Route C243 (Nunns Road) starts at an intersection with Route A10 and runs west and south before exiting.

References

Localities of Waratah–Wynyard Council
Towns in Tasmania